Kiamari Railway Station (Sindhi: ڪياماڙي ريلوي اسٽيشن) is located in Kiamari Town, Karachi, Sindh, Pakistan.۔

See also
 List of railway stations in Pakistan
 Pakistan Railways

References

Railway stations in Karachi
Railway stations on Karachi–Peshawar Line (ML 1)